Duncan Alexander Ross (November 4, 1873 – 1954) was an Ontario farmer and political figure. He represented Glengarry in the Legislative Assembly of Ontario from 1919 to 1923 as a United Farmers member.

He was born in Charlottenburg Township, Ontario, the son of Donald Ross, and was educated at the Ontario Agricultural College in Guelph. Ross married first Jemima Dingwall and second Laura Clifford McGregor. He was a director for the Glengarry Mutual Fire Insurance Company. He served as a member of the Canadian Farm Loan Board (later Farm Credit Canada) from 1943 to 1948. He died in 1954 and was buried at North Branch Cemetery in Martintown, Ontario.

References

Archives of Ontario; Toronto, Ontario, Canada; Registrations of Marriages, 1869-1928; Reel: 177
Archives of Ontario; Toronto, Ontario, Canada; Registrations of Marriages, 1869-1928; Series: MS932; Reel: 119

External links 

 
Stormont, Dundas and Glengarry : a history, 1784-1945, JG Harkness (1946)

1873 births
1954 deaths
United Farmers of Ontario MLAs
People from the United Counties of Stormont, Dundas and Glengarry